Gary Thomas Towse (born 14 May 1952) is an English retired professional footballer who played in the Football League for Brentford as a goalkeeper. He has had a long association with football in Folkestone after becoming a ballboy for his father's club Folkestone in 1958. He later played for the club as a goalkeeper and as an outfield player. He also served successor club Folkestone Invicta in a variety of roles, including goalkeeper, goalkeeping coach, groundsman and manager of the youth and reserve teams.

Personal life 
Towse worked for the police in Folkestone Harbour.

Career statistics

References

1952 births
English footballers
English Football League players
Brentford F.C. players
Living people
Footballers from Kent
Sportspeople from Dover, Kent
Association football goalkeepers
Folkestone F.C. players
Crystal Palace F.C. players
Jewish Guild players
Southern Football League players
Folkestone Invicta F.C. players
English expatriate sportspeople in South Africa
English expatriate footballers
Expatriate soccer players in South Africa
National Football League (South Africa) players
Association football utility players
Hythe Town F.C. players